Presidential elections were held in Ecuador in 1868. The result was a victory for Juan Javier Espinosa. He took office on 20 January.

References

Presidential elections in Ecuador
Ecuador
1868 in Ecuador
Election and referendum articles with incomplete results